Bill Ward is a Republican member of the North Carolina House of Representatives who has represented the 5th district (including all of Hertford, Gates, Pasquotank, and Camden counties) since 2023.

Committee assignments

2023-2024 session
Appropriations
Appropriations - General Government
Election Law and Campaign Finance Reform
Judiciary 3 (Vice Chair)
State Government
State Personnel

Electoral history

2022

References

Living people
Year of birth missing (living people)
People from Elizabeth City, North Carolina
Republican Party members of the North Carolina House of Representatives
21st-century American politicians